
The , also known as the Perfect Discourse (from the Greek ), is a religio-philosophical Hermetic treatise. The original Greek text, which was likely written in Alexandria between 100 CE and 300 CE, is largely lost and only a few fragments remain. However, the full text is extant in an early Latin translation, and fragments from a Coptic translation have also been found among the documents discovered in Nag Hammadi.

The text takes the form of a dialogue set in Egypt between Hermes Trismegistus and three of his students: Asclepius (a grandson of the Greek god and physician Asclepius), Tat, and Hammon. Hermes describes the physical makeup of the universe, the nature of the four elements, and the differences between individual souls. He professes the ultimate oneness of the world with God, despite the illusion of duplicity.

Medieval Latin readers had access to many Hermetic treatises of a 'technical' nature (astrological, alchemical, or magical, often translated from the Arabic).

Albertus Magnus (–1280) praised the idea developed in the  that the human being forms a link between God and the world, uniting in themselves both the spiritual nature of divine beings and the corporeal nature of the material world.

Notes

References

Bibliography

Translations and editions 
 (English translation of the Coptic fragments)
 (English translation of the Latin text)
 (critical edition of the Latin text)
 (English translation of the Latin text)

Secondary literature 

 

Hermetica
2nd-century books
3rd-century books
Nag Hammadi library
Hellenistic philosophical literature
Hellenistic religion